The 1915 Asmara earthquake took place outside Asmara, Eritrea on September 23 with an  of 6.2 and a maximum perceived intensity of VI (Strong) on the Mercalli intensity scale.

Effects
The event caused panic among the inhabitants and minor damage. The earthquake is described by experts as being of relatively large magnitude.

See also
 List of earthquakes in 1915
 List of earthquakes in Eritrea

References

External links

1915 Asmara
1915 earthquakes
1915 disasters in Africa